Ian Douglas Wright (born 17 May 1965, Suffolk, England) is an English television host, artist and comedian. Wright was host of Pilot Productions' travel/adventure television series Globe Trekker (also called Pilot Guides in Canada and the United States and originally broadcast as Lonely Planet). He also hosted the short-lived programme Ian Wright Live, a show filmed before a live audience and featured discussions on various travel topics.

A seasoned international traveller, Wright is perhaps the most recognizable host of Globe Trekker. He is known for his witty banter, cockney accent, and amusing interactions with locals. For 7 years, he hosted over 50 episodes of the programme, including Arctic Canada, Kyrgyzstan and Uzbekistan, Russia, Armenia, Ethiopia, Nepal and Australian Outback. To date, Wright has won three U.S. Cable Ace Awards for Best Magazine Host.

Wright now also stars in the cable channel Discovery Travel & Living show VIP Weekends with Ian Wright.

In 2008, Wright appeared in America The Wright Way which aired on the Travel Channel. In this series, Wright travels to American cities to visit interesting locations and interact with locals.

In 2010, he presented Eurovision Countdown for the European Broadcasting Union, previewing the songs that are to take part in the Eurovision Song Contest 2010.

The latest of Ian Wright's series is called Invite Mr Wright. The second series started in March 2012.

Personal life

Before appearing on television, Wright ran a community centre with his wife. Wright spent three months in Guyana as part of the Prince's Trust Operation Raleigh. He also had extensive travel experience in Egypt, India, Venezuela, Lebanon and Romania.

Wright is an accomplished painter, who had an exhibition of his work displayed at Chats Palace, Homerton, London. He has also played an active role in several after-school programmes for children. He currently lives in Suffolk with his wife and family. Wright enjoys playing football, eating out, and going for walks in the English countryside. Wright is a vegetarian, though he will occasionally break this for his travel documentaries.

Globe Trekker episodes
 
 (Alaska)
 (Arctic)
 (Rockies)
 (Baja California)
Best Treks
  
 (The North East)
  and Easter Island
  
 (New Delhi)
 
 

 
 
 (Deep South)

 
 

Globe Shopper 2
The Good & Bad Food Guide 2
Great Festivals 3
Great Journeys: Planes, Trains & Automobiles
  
  
 
 
 
 
  
 

 
 

 (Las Vegas)
 

Middle East

 
 
 
 (New York City)
  I
  II
 (north)
 
 (Northeast)
 and Lapland
 (Outback)

  
 (Rio de Janeiro)
  
 
 (Southeast)
  
 
 (Southern)
  
 
 
 and Zanzibar
 (Tahiti)
 
 (Tokyo)
  
 (Milford Track)

  
 (Tuscany)
  
Caribbean
  
 
 
 (Vienna)

References

External links
 
 Globe Trekker biography 
 Time Asia interview
 Pilot Guides interview

1965 births
Living people
Mass media people from Suffolk
English television presenters
English television personalities
Travel broadcasters